Zootaxa is a peer-reviewed scientific mega journal for animal taxonomists. It is published by Magnolia Press (Auckland, New Zealand). The journal was established by Zhi-Qiang Zhang in 2001 and new issues are published multiple times a week. From 2001 to 2020, more than 60,000 new species have been described in the journal accounting for around 25% of all new taxa indexed in The Zoological Record in the last few years. Print and online versions are available.

Temporary suspension from JCR
The journal exhibited high levels of self-citation and its journal impact factor of 2019 was suspended from Journal Citation Reports in 2020, a sanction which hit 34 journals in total.
Biologist Ross Mounce noted that high levels of self-citation may be inevitable for a journal which publishes a large share of new species classification. Later that year this decision was reversed and it was admitted that levels of self-citation are appropriate considering the large proportion of papers from its field published by Zootaxa.

See also
ZooKeys, a fully open access zoological journal
Phytotaxa, a botanical journal also published by Magnolia Press

References

External links

English-language journals
Continuous journals
Publications established in 2001
Zoology journals
Hybrid open access journals
Magnolia Press academic journals